is a Japanese former competitive figure skater. She is the 2000 Japanese national champion, a four-time medalist on the ISU Junior Grand Prix, and placed as high as 6th at the World Junior Championships (1998).

Career 
Chisato competed in three seasons of the ISU Junior Grand Prix series, winning three bronze medals and one silver. She qualified twice for the JGP Final. At the World Junior Championships, she placed 6th at the 1998 Junior Worlds, 11th in 1999, and 24th in 2000.

She competed once on the senior Grand Prix, placing 9th at the 2000 Skate America, and once at the Four Continents Championships, placing 14th in 2000.

She is currently touring with Disney on Ice in their "100 Years of Magic" show.

Competitive highlights
GP: Grand Prix; JGP: Junior Grand Prix

References

 Skatabase: 1990s Junior Worlds

External links
 Tracings.net profile

Japanese female single skaters
1982 births
Living people
Competitors at the 2003 Winter Universiade